Bangladesh eighth consecutive Olympiad was at the 2012 Summer Olympics in London from 27 July to 12 August 2012.

Five Bangladeshi athletes were selected to the team, 4 men and 1 woman, representing the nation in five sporting disciplines:  archery, athletics, gymnastics, shooting, and swimming. All of them were received under University places and by a tripartite invitation, without having qualified. Bangladesh, however, has yet to win an Olympic medal.

Archery

Athletics

Bangladesh has been given a wild card.

 Key
 Note – Ranks given for track events are within the athlete's heat only
 Q = Qualified for the next round
 q = Qualified for the next round as a fastest loser or, in field events, by position without achieving the qualifying target
 NR = National record
 N/A = Round not applicable for the event
 Bye = Athlete not required to compete in round

Men

Gymnastics

Bangladesh has been awarded a wild card.

Artistic
Men

Shooting

Women

Swimming

Bangladesh has been given a wildcard place for swimming

Men

References

Nations at the 2012 Summer Olympics
2012
2012 in Bangladeshi sport